

Tanya is the Slavic  hypocoristic of Tatiana. It is commonly used as an independent given name in the English-speaking world. The name's popularity among English-speakers (and other non-Slavs) was originally due to the popularity of Alexander Pushkin's verse novel Eugene Onegin, whose heroine is named Tatiana "Tanya" Larina.

Variants include Tania (Ukrainian, Romanian); Tanja (Bosnian/Croatian/Serbian, Norwegian, German, Danish, Estonian, Finnish, Dutch, Slovene and Macedonian); Táňa (Czech); Tânia; (Portuguese); and Taanya (Levant and Indian subcontinent).

As of 2010 it was the 237th most common name in the United States, according to namestatistics.com, which uses US Census data.

People with the name
 Lara Saint Paul, born Silvana Savorelli (1945–2018), also known as Tanya, Italian Eritrean singer, entertainer and record producer
 Major Tanya, stage name of Noelle Rose, professional wrestler from the Gorgeous Ladies of Wrestling
 Tanya Burr (born 1989), English vlogger and blogger
 Tanya Byron (born 1967), a British psychologist 
 Tanya Chan (born 1971), a legislator in Hong Kong
 Tanya Chisholm (born 1983), American actress and dancer
 Tanya Christiansen, American mathematician
 Tanya Chua (born 1975), a singer in Singapore
 Tania Coleridge (born 1966), British model/Girl in Father Figure music video
 Tanya Compas, British activist
 Tanya Donelly (born 1966), singer/guitarist for Throwing Muses, The Breeders, and Belly
 Tanya Dubnicoff (born 1969), Canadian track cyclist
 Tanya Dziahileva (born 1991), Belarusian model
 Tanya Garcia (born 1981), Filipina television and film actress
 Tanya Haden (born 1971), daughter of jazz double bassist Charlie Haden, wife of actor Jack Black
 Tanya Hansen (born 1973), Norwegian pornographic actress.
 Tanya Hughes (born 1972), American high jumper
 Tanya Hunks (born 1980), Canadian swimmer
 Tanya Kappo, Canadian lawyer and Indigenous rights activist
 Tanya Mercado (as known as Gina Lynn) (born 1974), Puerto Rican pornographic actress
 Tanya Moore (1955–1986), American murder victim
 Tanya Oxley (born 1979), Barbadian track and field sprinter
 Tanya Plibersek (born 1969), Australian politician and Minister for Health
 Tanya Roberts (1949–2021), actress
 Tanya Ryno, producer
 Tanya Savicheva (1930–1944), Russian child diarist who died in 1944 during the Siege of Leningrad
 Tanya Tagaq (born 1975), Canadian Inuk throat singer
 Tanya Tate (born 1979), a US-UK porno actress 
 Tanya Taylor, Canadian fashion designer 
 Tanya Tucker (born 1958), American country music singer

Fictional characters
 Tan-ya, main character in Korean fantasy/mythology Arthdal Chronicles, foretold to be the direct descendant of a goddess
 Tanya, character in Jacqueline Wilson novel Bad Girls
Tanya, character in the Mortal Kombat universe
 Agent Tanya Adams, soldier  in the Command & Conquer: Red Alert videogame series
 Tanya Branning, in the British TV soap opera EastEnders
 Tanya Mousekewitz, from the film An American Tail
 Tanya Robertson, from the movie Sleepwalkers
 Tanya Sloan, character from Power Rangers Turbo
 Tanya Turner, lead character on the ITV drama Footballers Wives
 Tanya von Degurechaff, main character in the novel series, manga, and anime, The Saga of Tanya the Evil

See also
 Tania (name)
 Tanja (name)
 Tonia (name)
 Tonja (name)
 Tonje (name)

References

Russian feminine given names
Croatian feminine given names
Slovene feminine given names
Serbian feminine given names
Macedonian feminine given names
Bulgarian feminine given names
Slavic feminine given names
Arabic feminine given names